Construção is the eighth studio album by Brazilian singer-songwriter Chico Buarque, released in December 1971. It was composed in periods between Buarque's exile in Italy and his return to Brazil. Lyrically, the album is loaded with criticisms of the Brazilian military dictatorship, especially with regard to the censorship imposed by the government at the time. It is widely regarded by music critics as one of the greatest Brazilian albums of all time, while its title track was named the greatest Brazilian song of all time by Rolling Stone in 2009.

Historical context 
Construção signaled Buarque's fundamental artistic maturation, both in terms of musical composition and lyrical style, showcasing and transcending his mastery of MPB (Musica Popular Brasileira/Popular Brazilian Music). In addition to its significant aesthetic achievement, the album's implicit criticism of the ruling Brazilian military dictatorship was greeted by the regime's opponents as an important cultural and socio-political statement, released as it was during the dictatorship's most repressive period. Because Buarque couched his criticism in such melodic beauty and lyrical obliqueness, and because of its popularity, the regime—surprisingly—neither banned nor censored Construção.

Music 
Buarque expertly imbued Construção's ten songs with elements of diverse musical styles.

The first track, "Deus lhe pague" (literally, "May God pay you back") was arranged with symphonic elements and rings with sardonic criticism of the military dictatorship (1964–1985) and its upper class and US allies. 

"Cotidiano" ("Daily Routine") whimsically chronicles the emotions, behaviors, and daily routine of a couple from the man's perspective, featuring a bluesy trombone, with the syncopated flow of Afro-Brazilian percussion rhythms. 

"Desalento" ("Discouragement"), couched in a laid-back, bossa nova arrangement, is a confession of shortcomings and a plea for forgiveness and is intentionally unspecific whether the context is personal or political. 

"Construção" ("Construction"), the fourth and title track, was arranged by Rogério Duprat, blending bossa nova, MPB, and symphonic musical styles with Afro-Brazilian rhythms to emphasize the 14 syllables verses, each of which ends in a proparoxytone word (a word with the stress on the antepenultimate syllable); it is considered by many the album's most poetically and musically complex piece. The subtext of social justice for construction workers (and low-income workers, in general), coupled with "Deus lhe pague", provides a dizzying critique of authoritarian societies that devalue the working poor to the point that their tragic lives at a time when labor rights were suppressed, are seen as an inconvenient interruption of daily bourgeoise self-absorbed lifestyles.

"Cordão" ("Cord"), the fifth track, is a defiant and uplifting bossa nova style declaration that opposes efforts to stifle an individual's creativity and freedom. 

The sixth track, "Olha Maria" ("Look, Mary"), is a beautiful and bittersweet tune recorded and performed with its cowriter, Antonio Carlos Jobim, as well as Lee Ritenour and Zimbo Trio. 

Buarque composed the seventh track, "Samba de Orly", with Toquinho and Vinicius de Moraes, and it is infused with both saudade and cautious hopefulness for political change in—and possible return to—Brazil from the perspective of formal- and self-exiled politicians and artists, many of whom lived abroad during much of the military government's twenty-two years in power. 

With "Valsinha" ("A Little Waltz"), the album's eighth song, Buarque again teamed up with Vinicius de Moraes to compose a delicate love song of courtship with deep stylistic roots in Portuguese folk traditional music. 

The ninth track, "Minha História" ("My Story"), a translation of "4/3/1943", an Italian song written by Lucio Dalla the same year, provides a thematic interlude in the album's narrative with a tale of a poor Brazilian boy christened "Jesus" by his unmarried mother. 

The last song, "Acalanto" ("Lullaby"), wraps up the album with a gentle cradle song tinged with sadness.

Acclaim and legacy 

Construção ranks Number 3 on Rolling Stone's list of 100 greatest Brazilian albums of all time. The magazine also voted its title track as the greatest Brazilian song, stating that it "is still a reference to understand a thorny period of Brazilian society". It also ranks Number 54 in the list of the 100 greatest records of the 20th century by German music magazine Spex. In September 2012, it was elected by the audience of Radio Eldorado FM, of Estadao.com e of Caderno C2+Música (both the latter belong to newspaper O Estado de S. Paulo) as the sixth best Brazilian album ever.

Track listing

Personnel
Credits adapted from AllMusic and Construção's liner notes.

Chico Buarque – Primary artist, vocals
Roberto Menescal – Producer, studio direction
Magro – Music director
Tom Jobim – Guest artist
MPB4 – Guest artist
Paulinho Jobim – Guest artist
Marco Mazzola – Technician
Toninho Barbosa – Technician
Aldo Luiz – Artwork
Carlos Leonam – Photography

References

External links 
 
  statistics, tagging and previews at Last.fm
  at Rate Your Music

1971 albums
Chico Buarque albums
Philips Records albums
Portuguese-language albums